The terms Primary Phase and Secondary Phase describe the first two radio series of The Hitchhiker's Guide to the Galaxy, first broadcast in 1978.  These were the first incarnations of the Hitchhiker's Guide to the Galaxy franchise.  Both were written by Douglas Adams and consist of six episodes each.

The series followed the aimless wanderings of Arthur Dent, Ford Prefect and his book, the eponymous Guide. It introduced unfamiliar music, mind-stretching concepts and the newest science mixed together with-out of-context parodies, unfeasibly rude names, "semantic and philosophical jokes", compressed prose and "groundbreaking deployment of sound effects and voice techniques". By the time the sixth episode was broadcast, the show had a cult following.  A Christmas special would follow, many repeats and a second series. The two original series were followed by three more in 2004 and 2005 and a final, sixth series in 2018.

The following article is a list of episodes from the Primary and Secondary Phases. For information on its production, see The Hitchhiker's Guide to the Galaxy.

The Primary Phase
The first radio series was broadcast on BBC Radio 4 in March and April 1978. It was split into episodes, known as "Fits" (an archaic term for a section of a poem revived by Lewis Carroll for The Hunting of the Snark). The original series comprised Fit the First to Fit the Sixth. Fits the Fifth and Sixth were co-written by John Lloyd; subsequent versions of the story omit most of Lloyd's material.

The success of the series encouraged Adams to adapt it into a novel, which was based on the first four Fits and released in the second week of October 1979. A slightly contracted double LP re-recording of the first four Fits was released in the same year, followed by a single LP featuring a revised version of Fits the Fifth and Sixth and the second book, both in 1980.

Fit the First
Broadcast on BBC Radio 4, 8 March 1978 10:30pm
Cast
 The Book (narrator): Peter Jones
 Arthur Dent: Simon Jones
 Prosser and Prostetnic Vogon Jeltz (Vogon Captain): Bill Wallis
 Ford Prefect: Geoffrey McGivern
 Lady Cynthia Fitzmelton: Jo Kendall
 The Barman: David Gooderson

As the episode opens Arthur Dent is attempting to prevent the local council, represented by Mr Prosser, from bulldozing his house to make way for a bypass.  Dent's friend, Ford Prefect arrives and takes him to the pub.  At the pub, Ford explains that he is not from Guildford after all, but from a  small planet somewhere in the vicinity of Betelgeuse, and that the world is about to end.

Meanwhile, Lady Cynthia Fitzmelton, a character unique to the radio series, has arrived at the site of Arthur Dent's house. She makes a speech about progress, and the future for the village of Cottington, and insults the residents in the process. She begins the construction of the bypass, and the demolition of Arthur Dent's house, by smashing a bottle of "very splendid and worthwhile" champagne against a yellow bulldozer. Ford and Arthur hear this, and Arthur races back to the former site of his house, Ford chasing after him after first buying some peanuts.

Shortly after Arthur and Ford return to the ruins of Arthur's house, a fleet of Vogon Constructor Ships arrives in the sky, and Prostetnic Vogon Jeltz broadcasts an announcement that they are to demolish the Earth to make way for a hyperspace bypass.  Panic ensues. Ford uses his "electronic thumb" to hitch a lift onto one of the ships, taking Arthur with him, just moments before the Earth is destroyed.

On board the Vogon Constructor Ship, Ford explains that he was a field researcher for the Hitchhiker's Guide to the Galaxy, and had been stuck on the Earth for several more years than he originally expected.  The two are soon captured by the Vogons, who take an unfriendly view of hitchhikers.

The episode ends on a cliffhanger, after the Vogon Captain tortures them by reading them some poetry, with them due to be thrown into space afterwards.

Music: 
"Journey of the Sorcerer" from One of These Nights by The Eagles; Lontano by György Ligeti; A Rainbow in Curved Air by Terry Riley; Volumina by György Ligeti.

Fit the Second
Broadcast on BBC Radio 4, 15 March 1978
Cast
 The Book: Peter Jones
 Arthur Dent: Simon Jones
 Ford Prefect: Geoffrey McGivern
 Prostetnic Vogon Jeltz: Bill Wallis
 Vogon Guard: David Tate  
Eddie the Computer: David Tate
 Trillian: Susan Sheridan
Zaphod Beeblebrox: Mark Wing-Davey
Marvin the Paranoid Android and Gag Halfrunt: Stephen Moore
 Announcer (uncredited): John Marsh

After the initial narration, the episode opens with a recap of the cliffhanger with the Vogon captain demanding what Ford and Arthur thought of his poem. They attempt to flatter him to avoid execution, but he decides to throw them off the ship anyway. Whilst being escorted to the airlock, Ford attempts to persuade the Vogon guard to give up his job, but fails.

The pair are thrown into space.  Improbably, they are rescued after 29 seconds, by a starship.  After some more improbable events they discover they have been picked up by the Starship Heart of Gold, which has been stolen by Ford's semi-cousin, and President of the Galaxy, Zaphod Beeblebrox. The Heart of Gold works on a basis of infinite improbability, allowing its drive to do anything for which the improbability factor is known.

Also on the Heart of Gold are Trillian (Tricia McMillan), whom Arthur met at a party in Islington, before she left the party (and the planet) to go with Zaphod Beeblebrox, and Marvin, a depressed android. The episode ends with a post-credit announcement from Eddie the Shipboard Computer that the ship is moving into orbit around the legendary planet of Magrathea.

Notes: First appearance of Marvin the Paranoid Android, Trillian, Eddie the computer, Gag Halfrunt, and Zaphod Beeblebrox.

Music: "Wind on Water" from Evening Star by Fripp and Eno; A Rainbow in Curved Air by Terry Riley; Poppy Nogood and the Phantom Band by Terry Riley;  Cachuaca by Patrick Moraz.

Fit the Third
Broadcast on BBC Radio 4, 22 March 1978
Cast
 The Book: Peter Jones
 Arthur Dent: Simon Jones
 Ford Prefect: Geoffrey McGivern
 Zaphod Beeblebrox: Mark Wing-Davey
 Eddie the Computer: David Tate
 Trillian: Susan Sheridan
 Recorded voice and Slartibartfast: Richard Vernon
 Sperm Whale (uncredited) and Marvin the Paranoid Android: Stephen Moore
 Announcer (uncredited): John Marsh

The episode begins with a narration describing the significance of Magrathea, a planet that long long ago manufactured custom-designed planets for rich businessmen.  Due to its immense success, Magrathea became the richest planet in the galaxy and the galactic economy collapsed.  Ford and Zaphod argue about the accuracy of this legend, Ford believing that it is nonsense, Zaphod believing he has found the long-lost planet.

As the ship orbits the planet, it triggers an automated  recorded message, from the Commercial Council of Magrathea, that notes that Magrathea is currently closed for business, and to leave.  A follow-up message announces that nuclear missiles will be launched against the ship.

The missiles are detected, and the crew struggle to get the Heart of Gold to escape the missiles.  Disaster is averted when Arthur activates the Infinite Improbability Drive and the missiles are turned into a bowl of petunias and a very surprised-looking sperm whale.  Trillian notes that her white mice (that she had taken with her from the Earth) have escaped.

The ship lands, and Ford, Arthur, Zaphod, Trillian and Marvin go onto the surface. (The episode, as released on CD, is edited here to avoid possible musical copyright concerns. ) They split up, and Zaphod, Trillian and Ford explore a tunnel, noting that they seem to be following the mice, whilst Arthur and Marvin are left on the surface as lookout.  Eventually, Slartibartfast comes to meet Arthur, and takes him into the interior of the planet, leaving Marvin behind.  Inside Magrathea, he shows Arthur a planet that they are working on at the moment.  Arthur recognises it as the Earth.  Slartibartfast explains that the original Earth had been destroyed five minutes too early, and they are constructing a replacement.  The original Earth had apparently been commissioned by some mice in order to find the "Ultimate Question".

Notes: First appearance of Slartibartfast. A reference by Arthur to Pink Floyd being played by Marvin is often cut out of this episode.

Music: Kotakomben from Einsteig by Gruppe Between; Space Theme from Go by Go; Continuum by György Ligeti; Oxygène by Jean Michel Jarre; That's Entertainment; Shine On You Crazy Diamond by Pink Floyd*; Rock and Roll Music by The Beatles*; Wind On Water from Evening Star by Fripp and Eno; Over Fire Island from Another Green World by Brian Eno

* denotes music from the portion of the episode removed from CD releases.

Fit the Fourth
Broadcast on BBC Radio 4, 29 March 1978
Cast
 The Book: Peter Jones
 Arthur Dent: Simon Jones
 Slartibartfast: Richard Vernon
 Deep Thought and Ford Prefect: Geoffrey McGivern
 Zaphod Beeblebrox: Mark Wing-Davey
 Trillian: Susan Sheridan
 First Computer Programmer/Bang Bang/Magrathean PA Voice: Ray Hassett
 Second Computer Programmer: Jeremy SR Browne
 Cheerleader and Majikthise: Jonathan Adams
 Vroomfondel and Shooty: James Broadbent
 Frankie Mouse: Peter Hawkins
 Benjy Mouse: David Tate
 Announcer (uncredited): John Marsh (introductory announcement only)
 Announcer (uncredited): Brian Perkins (closing announcement only)

The episode begins with a recap of the events of the series so far, before moving to a conversation where Slartibartfast explains that mice are really "the protrusions into our dimension of vast hyper-intelligent pan-dimensional beings", and that they commissioned the Earth to be built.  He plays Arthur some recordings explaining the historical events.  This race of pan-dimensional beings had constructed a great computer, called Deep Thought, to answer the Ultimate Question of Life, the Universe and Everything.  It did, after seven and a half million years, have the answer to the Ultimate Question, a rather disappointing 42.  Deep Thought explains that this is only disappointing because they never really understood what the Question was.  They ask the computer if he can find out what the Ultimate Question is.  Deep Thought cannot, but promises to design a computer that can, and names it, "Earth".

Slartibartfast explains that this computer was built by the Magratheans, and that the Vogons came and destroyed it five minutes before it was due to complete its run.  The mice summon Arthur and Slartibartfast to a meeting room, where they have discussed a proposal with Zaphod, Ford and Trillian.  The mice believe that as last-generation products of the computer matrix, Arthur and Trillian should be in an ideal position to find out the Question, and offer to make them "extremely rich" if they can do so.  (In later versions this would be replaced with the mice wishing to extract Arthur's brain).  The negotiations are interrupted by the arrival of a Galactic Police ship, pursuing Zaphod for his theft of the Heart of Gold.

The Police confront Arthur, Ford, Trillian and Zaphod, and shoot at them, whilst explaining that they find violence upsetting.  After a particularly long volley of fire, the computer bank they are hiding behind explodes, and the episode ends.

Music: A Rainbow in Curved Air by Terry Riley; Moon City from In Search of Ancient Gods by Absolute Elsewhere; Mikrophonie I by Stockhausen.

Fit the Fifth
Written by Douglas Adams and John Lloyd
Broadcast on BBC Radio 4, 5 April 1978
Cast
 The Book: Peter Jones
 Arthur Dent: Simon Jones
 Ford Prefect: Geoffrey McGivern
 Zaphod Beeblebrox: Mark Wing-Davey
 Trillian: Susan Sheridan
 Garkbit/The Great Prophet Zarquon: Anthony Sharp
 Compere (Max Quordlepleen): Roy Hudd
 Marvin the Paranoid Android: Stephen Moore
 Announcer (uncredited): John Marsh

The episode begins where previous episode ended, with the computer bank exploding. Arthur, Ford, Trillian and Zaphod wake up in a strange place, and assume it must be the afterlife.  It becomes apparent however that in fact it is Milliways, the Restaurant at the End of the Universe, which is located in the far future at the moment that the universe ends.  They dine, but are interrupted by a telephone call from Marvin.  A waiter explains that the Restaurant was in fact constructed in the ruins of Magrathea.  Meanwhile, Marvin has been waiting on the surface of the planet.  After he whines somewhat, the four go down to the car park (where Marvin has been parking cars), and meet up with Marvin.  Ford and Zaphod are transfixed by the spaceships in the carpark, and discover a totally black, totally frictionless ship.  Stuck without the Heart of Gold, they decide to steal it, with Marvin's help.

When on the ship, they discover that it is out of control, and since the interior is also totally black none of the controls are legible.  They debate what the Question is, and Marvin reveals that he can read it in Arthur's brainwave patterns.  Before he can reveal what it is, they are interrupted by the control panels lighting up suddenly and the ship coming out of hyperspace.  They realise they are outside of the galaxy, and part of an intergalactic battle fleet.

Music: Melodien by György Ligeti; The Engulfed Cathedral from Snowflakes are Dancing by Isao Tomita; A Rainbow in Curved Air by Terry Riley; Wind on Water from Evening Star by Fripp and Eno.

Fit the Sixth
Written by Douglas Adams and John Lloyd
Broadcast on BBC Radio 4, 12 April 1978
Cast
 The Book: Peter Jones
 Arthur Dent: Simon Jones
 Ford Prefect: Geoffrey McGivern
 Zaphod Beeblebrox: Mark Wing-Davey
 Trillian: Susan Sheridan
 "B" Ark Captain and Caveman: David Jason
 Number One and Management Consultant: Jonathan Cecil
 Haggunenon Underfleet Commander/Number Two/Hairdresser: Aubrey Woods
 Marketing Girl: Beth Porter
 Announcer (uncredited): John Marsh

The episode opens with the main characters on the black ship.  Soon, they receive a transmission from the second-in-command of the battle fleet, who makes a report to Zaphod, believing him to be the Admiral.  This is considered confusing as Zaphod was just presumed to be the Admiral, despite bearing no resemblance to the second-in-command, who looked like a leopard.

Shortly afterward, they receive another transmission, this time with Trillian in the chair.  The second-in-command, who now looks like a shoebox, assumes that Trillian is the Admiral.

They look up the name "Haggunenon", spoken by the second-in-command, in the Guide, and discover that they are a race of xenophobic shape-shifters.  They realise that the Admiral is in fact on the ship, but had shapeshifted.  It becomes a "carbon copy" of the Ravenous Bugblatter Beast of Traal.  The group split up, Arthur and Ford taking one escape capsule and Zaphod and Trillian attempting to take another.

Arthur notices that the other escape capsule isn't escaping, and presses a button in his escape capsule that ends up teleporting him and Ford to a strange spaceship. Meanwhile, Zaphod, Trillian and Marvin are all eaten by the copy of the Ravenous Bugblatter Beast of Traal, with Marvin's leg coming off in the process, and Zaphod's second head is revealed to know French (via an ad-lib by Mark Wing-Davey). This is the last appearance of the character of Trillian until the Tertiary Phase.

The spaceship to which Ford and Arthur have teleported, marked as "Golgafrincham Ark Fleet, Ship B" is filled with bodies, such as frozen telephone sanitisers, hairdressers, and advertising account executives.  Whilst inspecting the bodies, they are captured by Number Two, the third-in-command of the ship, who takes them to the bridge.

Here, they meet the Captain (who is taking a bath in a large bathtub in the bridge, and has been for several years).  He reluctantly grants permission to Number Two to interrogate Arthur and Ford, and asks him to find out what they want to drink.

Conversing with the Captain, they discover that the bodies are not, as they believed, dead, but frozen.  They are intending to colonise another planet, because their original planet was "doomed".  The "A Ark" was supposed to contain leaders, the "C Ark" to contain workers, and the "B Ark" to contain middle-men.  It becomes apparent that the stories of impending doom were nonsense, and the A Ark and C Ark were never launched.

The story resumes some months later, with a meeting of the Colonisation Committee.  Reports to the Committee include an update on the development of the wheel (it is unclear what colour it should be), and a documentary about the native cave-men of the planet, who have started to die out since the arrival of the Golgafrinchams.

Ford explains that they had done some research on the planet, and that it will last only two million years (but not why - because it is the pre-history of the Earth, and is thus due to be destroyed by the Vogons in two million years time).

Arthur attempts to teach the cave-men Scrabble, in order to try to stop the Golgafrinchams supplanting them.  The cave-man spells out "FORTY TWO" on the scrabble board, and Ford and Arthur realise that the program must have gone wrong because of the arrival of the Golgafrinchams.  They decide to use the same technique (of choosing scrabble letters) randomly to find out what the question in Arthur's brainwave patterns is, although it might be wrong anyway.

The question in his brain is revealed as "WHAT DO YOU GET IF YOU MULTIPLY SIX BY NINE".  The episode ends as they decide to rejoin the Golgafrincham colony, and lament the inevitable eventual destruction of the Earth.

The regular ending music is replaced with "What a Wonderful World" by Louis Armstrong.

Music: Oxygène by Jean Michel Jarre; Volumina by György Ligeti; Volkstanz from Einsteig by Gruppe Between.

The Secondary Phase

What became "Fit the Seventh" actually started as a "Christmas Special" episode, and an early draft included a reference to the holiday, though the episode, as transmitted, does not. Five further episodes, to complete the second series (later retitled "The Secondary Phase") were commissioned in May 1979. These final five episodes (the last on radio until 2004) were 'stripped,' or broadcast on each of five days in a single week in January 1980.

Trillian is entirely missing from this series.  Her fate is addressed in Fit the Seventh, that she had effected an escape but had then been forcibly married to the President of the Algolian chapter of the Galactic Rotary Club.  The character returns in The Tertiary Phase, where she dismisses most of the events of the Secondary Phase as having been one of Zaphod's "psychotic episodes."

Fit the Seventh
Broadcast on BBC Radio 4, 24 December 1978
Cast
 The Book: Peter Jones
 Arthur Dent: Simon Jones
 Ford Prefect/Frogstar Robot/Air Traffic Controller: Geoffrey McGivern
 Zaphod Beeblebrox: Mark Wing-Davey
 Marvin the Paranoid Android and Gag Halfrunt: Stephen Moore
 Arcturan Number One: Bill Paterson
 Arcturan Captain/Radio Voice/Receptionist/Lift: David Tate
 Roosta: Alan Ford
 Announcer (uncredited): John Marsh

The episode opens in the Hitchhiker's offices on Ursa Minor Beta, with a receptionist claiming that Zarniwoop, the editor of the guide, is too busy to take a call because he is both in his office, and on an intergalactic cruise.

It then moves to the bridge of a megafreighter that is due to land on Ursa Minor Beta.  A crewmember denounces the Hitchhiker's Guide for being soft, and notes that he has heard they have created a whole artificial universe.  Zaphod Beeblebrox is a hitch-hiker on the freighter, and as he listens to the radio, he hears a report that he has died, by being eaten by a Haggunenon.  The manner of his escape is left unclear.

Meanwhile, Arthur and Ford are stuck in Earth's pre-history, drunk.  As they discuss their predicament, they notice a spaceship half-appearing in front of them.  They celebrate their rescue, and it vanishes.  Eventually they deduce that this is a time paradox, and they need to figure out how to signal the ship in the future so they can be rescued. Following this is the Guide's entry on the subject of towels, making its first appearance.

On the ship, Zaphod explains to the crewmember that he is going to Ursa Minor Beta to find out what he's doing.  He received a message from himself the previous night, telling him to see Zarniwoop in order to learn something to his disadvantage.  Zaphod then explains how he escaped - the Haggunenon turned into an escape capsule before it got the chance to eat him.

Zaphod arrives at the Hitchhiker's offices, and demands to see Zarniwoop, but is given the same excuses as before.  After revealing his identity, he is directed to Zarniwoop's office, and meets up with Marvin, who had also survived and coincidentally arrived at the same place.  After Marvin persuades the lift to take them upwards, the building starts to shake, due to it being bombed.

Zaphod is met by Roosta, who blames the bombing on Zaphod failing to conceal his presence on the planet adequately.  A Frogstar Robot class D soon arrives to come and get Zaphod.  Zaphod orders Marvin to stop it (which he does, by tricking it into destroying the floor it is standing on), whilst Zaphod and Roosta escape into the pocket universe in Zarniwoop's office.

From the perspective of the three later radio series, all of the subsequent events of the Secondary Phase occur only in Zarniwoop's artificial universe, and not in the 'real' universe.  They are later dismissed by Trillian as "psychotic episodes."

Eventually, the Frogstar Robots decide to take the entire building back to the Frogstar.

Fit the Eighth
Broadcast on BBC Radio 4, 21 January 1980
Cast
 The Book: Peter Jones
 Zaphod Beeblebrox: Mark Wing-Davey
 Roosta: Alan Ford
 Frogstar Prisoner Relations Officer/Eddie the Computer: David Tate
 Arthur Dent: Simon Jones
 Ford Prefect: Geoffrey McGivern
 Gargravarr: Valentine Dyall
 Announcer (uncredited): John Marsh

The episode opens with Zaphod and Roosta in the Guide building, which is being towed to the Frogstar, "the most totally evil place in the Galaxy".  Roosta explains that they are going to feed Zaphod to the "Total Perspective Vortex", which no one has ever survived.  A Frogstar Prisoner Relations Officer teleports in, to taunt Zaphod.

Meanwhile, in Earth's past, Ford and Arthur are still dealing with the rescue ship that has half-appeared in front of them.  Rather stuck for how to signal it, they wave a towel at it, and surprisingly, the spaceship appears to notice this and lands rather catastrophically, trapping them under a boulder, and sending the towel into a lava flow.

They appear to be stuck, so they ask The Guide what to do if one is stuck under a rock, with no hope of rescue. The guide has an entry that begins, 'Consider how lucky you are that life has been good to you so far...'

However, it becomes apparent that the boulder they are under is actually the ship, the Heart of Gold, and Zaphod Beeblebrox comes out of it, rather the worse for wear.  He explains that he has been put in the Total Perspective Vortex, and survived.  After this, he celebrated and is hungover from a week's celebration.  He explains that the towel had been fossilised, and when the Earth was blown up two million years later, the Improbability Drive picked it up.

The story then continues in flashback, picking up with Zaphod and Roosta on the Guide building.  They attempt to escape with a "body debit" (teleport) card, but are foiled by the Relations Officer.  He then tricks Zaphod into signing a consent form for entering the Vortex, and is then teleported to the service.  He meets Gargravarr, a disembodied voice, the guardian of the Vortex.  He is then placed in it, and exposed to its action, which is to place the user into Total Perspective by showing, with unfiltered perception, themselves in relation to the universe, for a moment.  Zaphod survives, much to the astonishment of Gargravarr.  He reports that it showed him that he is a "really great guy".

Fit the Ninth
Broadcast on BBC Radio 4, 22 January 1980
Cast
 The Book: Peter Jones
 Arthur Dent: Simon Jones
 Ford Prefect/Ventilation System: Geoffrey McGivern
 Zaphod Beeblebrox: Mark Wing-Davey
 Vogon Captain: Bill Wallis
 Marvin the Paranoid Android/Vogon Guard/Gag Halfrunt: Stephen Moore
 Eddie the Computer/Vogon Guard/Vogon Computer: David Tate
 Nutrimat Machine: Leueen Willoughby
 Zaphod Beeblebrox IV: Richard Goolden
 Announcer (uncredited): John Marsh
 One of the singing robots (uncredited): Geoffrey Perkins
 Another of the singing robots (uncredited): Paddy Kingsland

The episode opens with Ford and Arthur discussing Zaphod's sanity on board the Heart of Gold. Ford also starts correcting Arthur's grammar, forcing Arthur to refer to Earth in the past tense, as it had been demolished in Fit the First. Ford then begins to question the reason given for the demolition, stating "that was all done away with centuries ago. No one demolishes planets anymore." Ford has noticed another fleet of Vogon ships following the Heart of Gold at a distance of five light years for half an hour. He then calls for Marvin to bring Zaphod to the bridge.

Meanwhile, Prostetnic Vogon Jeltz confirms the identity of the ship and its occupants, then proceeds to wipe out half his crew in a fit of rage. After this massacre, he contacts Gag Halfrunt. Halfrunt is revealed not only to be Jeltz's psychiatrist (as well as Zaphod's), but also the psychiatrist who originally hired Jeltz to destroy first the Earth, then any survivors. Jeltz is asked to hold off on his final destruction of the Heart of Gold until Halfrunt can make an arrangement for fees still owed by Zaphod.

Halfrunt contacts Zaphod, who has since arrived on the Heart of Gold's bridge, but refuses to see the Vogon threat as anything more than a delusion of grandeur. Zaphod destroys the Heart of Gold's radio, then attempts to get the ship's computer to engage the Infinite Improbability Drive in order to get the Heart of Gold away from the Vogons. The computer states that this is not possible, as all its circuits have become busy with another task, and insists that the result will be something they can all "Share and Enjoy."

The Guide explains that "Share and Enjoy" is the motto of the Sirius Cybernetics Corporation Complaints Division. A song, sung by the company's robots, with voices a flattened fifth out of tune, is heard. Another product of SCC that never works, the Nutrimat, is introduced, as Arthur is attempting to get it to dispense tea. Arthur eventually converses with the Nutrimat, the floor and the ventilation system, trying to convince them that he wants tea, when Eddie the ship's computer is finally brought in, to work out "why the human prefers boiled leaves to everything we have to offer him...."

This is then revealed to be the problem preventing the computer from evading the Vogons. Zaphod decides to contact his great-grandfather, Zaphod Beeblebrox IV, through a seance. More background behind Zaphod's actual job and a conspiracy to discover the real ruler of the universe is revealed. As the episode ends, Eddie has been restored to normal function, and engages the IID, getting the ship out of firing range of the Vogons in the nick of time.

Fit the Tenth
Broadcast on BBC Radio 4, 23 January 1980
Cast
 The Book: Peter Jones
 Arthur Dent: Simon Jones
 Ford Prefect: Geoffrey McGivern
 Zaphod Beeblebrox: Mark Wing-Davey
 Eddie the Computer: David Tate
 Marvin the Paranoid Android: Stephen Moore
 Bird One: Ronald Baddiley
 Bird Two and Footwarrior: John Baddeley
 The Wise Old Bird: John Le Mesurier
 Lintilla: Rula Lenska
 Announcer (uncredited): John Marsh

The episode opens with more background material on Arthur Dent, specifically how the "remarkably unremarkable" human from Earth had an effect on the war between the G'Gugvunts and Vl'Hurgs, and will now have further significance on the planet Brontitall, where the Heart of Gold has just arrived. Zaphod and Ford discuss their arrival in a cave with Eddie the computer, noting the cold. Eddie calculates after they, and Arthur and Marvin, have departed the ship, that they are thirteen miles above ground level, despite there not being any mountains on the planet.

The four begin to explore the cave. Shortly, Arthur falls out of the cave mouth. Zaphod nearly falls as well, but catches the lip of the cave mouth, then discovers for himself that they are "miles up in the air." Ford talks to Zaphod while the latter dangles.

Meanwhile, Arthur has managed to fall onto a large passing bird. The bird reveals that the "cave" is actually a mile long marble sculpture of a plastic cup, hanging in the sky, part of a larger statue. The bird flies Arthur to the main statue, which is known as "Arthur Dent Throwing the Nutrimatic Cup." Arthur then reveals himself to be the very person that the statue is modeled after, and the bird flies into the statue's right ear, where the rest of his kind live. Arthur meets them, and their leader, the Wise Old Bird, and learns a few things about the past of Brontitall. For example, the statue was built in Arthur's honour after his argument with the Nutrimat Machine inspired them to rid themselves of the "blight of the robots". There is one thing the birds refuse to speak of, however, and the Wise Old Bird tells Arthur, "if you want to know, you will have to descend to the ground...."

The Guide mentions how little is still considered to be unspeakable in the galaxy, except for the rudest word in existence: "Belgium". Zaphod uses this word to finally convince Ford to attempt a rescue, still dangling from the lip of the mile-long cup. The attempt fails, and both of them fall out of the cup, and onto another passing bird.

On the surface, Arthur encounters a Footwarrior, who has declared the planet of Brontitall to be the property of the Dolmansaxlil Galactic Shoe Corporation. Fleeing the Footwarrior, Arthur takes refuge in a trench with an archaeologist named Lintilla, who tells Arthur that she's on Brontitall to discover why the Footwarriors are all limping due to blisters, as the episode ends.

Fit the Eleventh
Broadcast on BBC Radio 4, 24 January 1980
Cast
 The Book: Peter Jones
 Arthur Dent: Simon Jones
 Lintilla (and two clones): Rula Lenska
 Ford Prefect: Geoffrey McGivern
 Zaphod Beeblebrox: Mark Wing-Davey
 Bird and Footwarrior: John Baddeley
 Hig Hurtenflurst: Marc Smith
 Film Commentator and Computeach: David Tate
 Pupil and Marvin the Paranoid Android: Stephen Moore
 Announcer (uncredited): John Marsh

After a brief recap, the episode opens with a conversation between Lintilla and Arthur. Lintilla mentions that she's an archaeologist, stranded on Brontitall, as her spaceship was disabled. She activates her crisis inducer, and leads Arthur through a set of tunnels. While they're running, the narrator describes the state of medical science in the universe, with artificially induced injuries.

Meanwhile, Zaphod and Ford have landed on the back of one of the birds from the previous episode, and eventually convince it to reach the ground by wrapping Ford's towel around its eyes. But because the bird had to reach the ground, it and its fellow birds are upset, and start attacking Zaphod and Ford on the surface. A loud noise occurs, which causes the narrator to explain its lack of immediate context.

Arthur emerges from a tunnel behind Lintilla, who had overcompensated for her artificially induced crisis. Lintilla introduces Arthur to two of her "sisters" (actually clones), and they begin discussing the noise, finally establishing a context for it. Lintilla finally admits that there are 578,000,000,000 clones of herself in the universe. The narrator explains how this happened, and what is being done about it. Lintilla takes Arthur to the shaft suddenly created after the mysterious loud noise, and they finally confirm what the three Lintillas had been looking for: "An entire archaeological layer of compressed shoes." After making this confirmation, they are captured by Hig Hurtenflurst, who only happens to be a Dolmansaxlil Shoe Corporation executive.

The narrator finally describes what made the noise and created the shaft that gave the Lintillas their breakthrough. It's none other than Marvin, who himself finally fell out of the cup that the Heart of Gold is parked in. He's lying at the bottom of a mile deep shaft, and goes "zootlewurdle." Meanwhile, Hig has decided to take Lintilla and Arthur back to his office.

Hig explains the background of what happened to Brontitall - they fell victim to a Dolmansaxlil Shoe Shop Intensifier Ray, forcing them to construct nothing but shoe shops, and selling nothing but badly made shoes. Arthur learns that Earth was to be one of the next targets, spared from this by being demolished by the Vogons. The film being shown to Arthur and Lintilla explaining the Shoe Shop Intensifier Ray is suddenly interrupted, as is power to the office, when Marvin decides to rescue Arthur and Lintilla, and her two clones.

The narrator then explains that the Shoe Shop Intensifier Ray was unnecessary, that a "Shoe Event Horizon" would have occurred on that planet, and many other worlds, as part of their natural economic histories. A lesson from the future is heard, explaining this principle. Lintilla, Arthur and Marvin continue their escape, while Ford and Zaphod finally arrive at a large, very old building, and enter it to take shelter from the still angry bird people.

They discover that the building is a spaceport, and find abandoned ships left inside it. One such ship is still connected to supply lines, and still has power. Zaphod makes himself a stethoscope (for both heads), and holds it to the hull of this ship. He's stunned by what he hears inside, and here the episode ends.

Fit the Twelfth
Broadcast on BBC Radio 4, 25 January 1980
Cast
 The Book: Peter Jones
 Arthur Dent: Simon Jones
 Ford Prefect and Varntvar The Priest: Geoffrey McGivern
 Zaphod Beeblebrox: Mark Wing-Davey
 Lintillas and Android Stewardess: Rula Lenska
 The Allitnils: David Tate
 Poodoo: Ken Campbell
 Autopilot and Zarniwoop: Jonathan Pryce
 Marvin the Paranoid Android and The Man in the Shack: Stephen Moore
 Announcer (uncredited): John Marsh

The episode begins with a reprise of the action from Fit the Eleventh: Ford and Zaphod have discovered a derelict spaceport, including one ship, still intact, with its supply lines still connected, and still having power. Zaphod creates a stethoscope for both heads out of some pieces of tubing, and is shocked at what he hears inside. Ford asks to listen, and finally, everyone gets to hear an android stewardess making an announcement about their delayed space flight. Zaphod calculates that the ship is in fact over 900 years late. Ford and Zaphod agree to find their way into the ship to investigate further.

Meanwhile, Arthur and Lintilla finally find Lintilla's two clones on Brontitall, but they, along with Marvin, are discovered by the Footwarriors as power is restored. Arthur agrees to run down the corridor while the others lay down cover fire with "a gun of some sort", then Arthur will have them throw the gun to him, so that he can lay down cover fire while they run to meet him. As Arthur completes the first part of this task, he's met by a man named Poodoo, a priest named Varntvar, and three men named Allitnil. During this confusion, Arthur manages to get Lintilla to throw the gun down the corridor, and starts firing to cover their run to join him.  While Arthur does this, Poodoo is explaining how keen he is to introduce the Allitnils to the Lintillas, for a quiet social evening, and "a priest [is] on hand in case anybody wants to get married at all. Just to round off the evening." Arthur questions his sanity.

The Lintillas finally join Arthur, and Poodoo seizes his opportunity to introduce the Allitnils to them. They are immediately overwhelmingly attracted to each other, but are warned off from kissing each other until married. The priest is then called upon to perform three weddings. As the weddings conclude and the men kiss their brides, two of the three pairs disappear in "a puff of unsmoke" as Arthur discovers that the marriage certificates are actually cloning machine company "Agreements to Cease to Be" and cries out, stopping the final couple from kissing.

At this point, we go back to Ford and Zaphod entering the very late space ship, just as the passengers are being woken from suspended animation for coffee and biscuits. Ford and Zaphod flee the scene, eventually arriving on the flight deck, where they are continually ordered by the autopilot to return to their seats. The autopilot argues with them over the statistical likelihood of another civilisation delivering the lemon soaked paper napkins required by the spaceship before it can depart, and Ford and Zaphod flee again, this time to the First Class compartment. Here, a man introduces himself to Zaphod as Zarniwoop, whom Zaphod had been seeking since Fit the Seventh.

The action returns to Arthur, the remaining Lintilla, and Marvin. We learn that Arthur had killed the last Allitnil, the anti-clone, and Marvin tied up Poodoo and Varntvar, leaving them forced to listen to a cassette tape of Marvin's autobiography. As they finally exit the Dolmansaxlil building, they set out for the same spaceport that Ford and Zaphod are in, but then discover that the suspended cup is heading towards the surface, with the Heart of Gold still inside.

Meanwhile, Zarniwoop has offered Ford and Zaphod some drinks, and attempts to explain the whole situation to them. Zarniwoop starts by explaining that they had been in an artificially created universe within his office, then explains that he and Zaphod had co-conspired to discover who was really ruling the galaxy, as it was obvious it wasn't the President. Zaphod succeeds in his task, bringing the Heart of Gold - its improbability drive being necessary to reach the realm of the real ruler of the galaxy - to Zarniwoop's hiding place. Zarniwoop begins "dismantling" the artificial universe, and causes the cup to head to the surface outside.

After the narrator describes who might be ruling the universe, we hear the voice of an old man attempting to feed his cat a bit of fish. This old man seems to have his own unique perspective on things, but had noticed a white ship approaching. This ship, the Heart of Gold, discharges four of its passengers: Ford, Zaphod, Arthur and Zarniwoop, who approach the old man's shack. They attempt to question him about the decisions he makes about the galaxy, but he gives everything a vague answer. He does however reveal that he may have given his assent to the men who regularly seek his advice, thus giving Zaphod permission, under the pressure of the galaxy's psychiatrists, to destroy Earth before the Ultimate Question was revealed, thus securing their jobs. Arthur leaves angrily. Zarniwoop attempts further questions, but is eventually brushed off, and it's discovered that Arthur has made away with the Heart of Gold, with Lintilla and Marvin aboard. This leaves Ford, Zaphod and Zarniwoop stranded on the "Old Man in the Shack"'s planet, and here the episode ends - though open-ended with a spoken possibility of another series.

Casting in both series
As the first episode was originally commissioned as a pilot, much of the casting was done by Adams and Simon Brett, his original radio producer. Brett departed the BBC after the pilot episode was recorded, and so casting suggestions and decisions were made by Adams and Geoffrey Perkins for the remainder of both series. Perkins, using Brett's original notes, remarks that three or four people were auditioned for the part of the narrator, in search of a "Peter Jones-y sort of voice" before Peter Jones himself was actually contacted. Perkins also describes the casting of Simon Jones, Geoffrey McGivern, Jo Kendall, Bill Wallis and many others throughout the book containing the original radio series scripts.

Adams's own notes on the casting of Peter Jones ("who can we get to do a Peter Jonesey voice?"), Stephen Moore ("Stephen would find the character immediately and would make it really excellent"), Mark Wing-Davey ("He played a guy [in The Glittering Prizes] who took advantage of people and was very trendy"), David Tate ("He was one of the backbones of the series.  We had him there every week"), Richard Vernon ("He's so funny.  He carved himself a niche playing all sort of grandfatherly types"), Susan Sheridan ("Susan never found anything major to do with the role, but that wasn't her fault, it was my fault") and Roy Hudd ("To this day he still claims he doesn't know what it was all about")  can be found in Neil Gaiman's book Don't Panic: The Official Hitch-Hiker's Guide to the Galaxy Companion.

Airdates
The programme was aired on BBC Radio 4, on the following dates:

1978 First–Sixth: 8 March – 12 April; repeated 23 April – 28 May; and 1 November – 6 December; Seventh: 24 December; repeated 26 December
1979 Seventh: 8 April; First–Sixth: 1 July – 5 August;  Seventh: 24 December
1980 Eighth–Twelfth: 21–25 January; repeated 24 February – 23 March
1981 Ninth: 7 January; First–Twelfth: 7 April – 12 June
1983 First–Twelfth: 27 March – 12 June, plus Seventh: 5 April
1984 Seventh–Twelfth: 24–29 December

US airdates

In 1980 a few American radio stations had broadcast the series (and a hardback was released in October), and the programme was finally broadcast in stereo by US National Public Radio in March 1981, prior to the first US book's paperback release in October of the same year. The episodes aired on NPR were not the complete episodes heard in the UK—they were edited down from their original 29+ minute running time to 25–26 minutes.

Notes

References

 
 
 The Guide to Twenty Years' Hitchhiking Radio 4 programme, broadcast 5 March 1998.
 The Hitchhiker's Guide to the Galaxy UK DVD release, featuring a behind-the-scenes look at "Fit the Ninth." BBC Video, catalogue number BBCDVD 1092.
 The Hitchhiker's Guide to the Galaxy: Collector's Edition 8-CD set, containing the original 12 radio episodes from 1978 and 1980, as well as an untransmitted interview with Ian Johnstone and the twentieth anniversary programme. .

External links
 Original Series webpage at BBC Online

The Hitchhiker's Guide to the Galaxy (radio series)